Chester Emmette "Chet" Wolfrum (June 4, 1910 - December 20, 1973). served in the California State Assembly from 1959 to 1961. He represented the 56th Assembly District, in Los Angeles County.

Wolfrum was born in St. Paul, Minnesota, on June 4, 1910

A Republican, he entered the State Assembly after winning a special election held October 20, 1959, to fill a vacancy created by the death of Assemblyman Seth J. Johnson. One of five candidates, he won election with 49.7% of the vote. He won re-election in November 1960. In 1962, after redistricting changed the composition of the district, he lost his seat to Democrat Charles Warren.

References

External links

Join California Chet Wolfrum

1910 births
1973 deaths
Republican Party members of the California State Assembly
20th-century American politicians